Svensson Heights is a suburb in the Bundaberg Region, Queensland, Australia. In the  Svensson Heights had a population of 3,203 people.

Geography 
The suburb is bounded by Takalvan Street to the west and Walker Street to the north.

The land use is residential in the north of the suburb and industrial in the south.

History 
In the  Svensson Heights had a population of 3,203 people.

References 

Bundaberg Region